State Road 29 (SR 29) is a state highway that runs north–south through Southwest Florida.  A rural road, it runs mostly through uninhabited farmland in its northern half, and along wetlands in its southern half.

Route description

State Road 29 begins at an intersection with U.S. Route 41 (Tamiami Trail) in the small community of Carnestown, located just 4 miles north of Everglades City.  From there, it travels north along the western edge of the Big Cypress National Preserve and the eastern edge of the Fakahatchee Strand Preserve State Forest, which the road borders until it reaches Interstate 75 (Alligator Alley) at Miles City.

North of I-75, State Road 29 borders the Florida Panther National Wildlife Refuge to the west and continues to border the Big Cypress National Preserve up to a point just south of Sunniland.

SR 29 turns west briefly and back north through the city of Immokalee, a small farming town with large migrant populations.  Just north of Immokalee, SR 29 intersects with State Road 82, which travels west to Fort Myers.  SR 29 continues due north through more agricultural areas until it reaches the city of LaBelle, where it runs through the city center and intersects State Road 80, a transpeninsular route connecting Fort Myers and West Palm Beach.

After crossing the Caloosahatchee River on a small drawbridge, SR 29 turns northeast and continues to its northern terminus at an intersection with US 27 (unsigned SR 25), just south of Palmdale.

History

State Road 29 was extended from Immokalee to Everglades City in the 1920s around the same time as the construction of the Tamiami Trail.  Its construction was championed by Barron Collier as a land connection to Everglades City (the county seat of Collier County at the time).  The route was designated State Road 164 until 1945, when it was changed to State Road 29 as part of a statewide renumbering.  State Road 29 was extended from Everglades City to Chokoloskee in 1956 upon the completion of a causeway across Chokoloskee Bay

South of Immokalee, SR 29 ran alongside the now-abandoned Atlantic Coast Line Railroad Haines City Branch from Harrisburg (just south of Palmdale) to Everglades City, which was also built in the 1920s.  Part of this line was once the Deep Lake Railroad, which was once owned by Barron Collier.  The railroad was removed from Sunniland south to Everglades City in 1957, and the rest of it was removed in the 1980s.

Before the Florida Department of Transportation removed a large number of State Roads from its list for state control and maintenance, SR 29 continued south through the towns of Jerome, Copeland, and then meeting Everglades City just outside the Everglades National Park. Now designated County Road 29 north of Everglades City and County Road 29A south of it, the historic southern terminus of SR 29 is in Chokoloskee, on Chokoloskee Island within the National Park.

When plans were made to upgrade Alligator Alley to carry Interstate 75 in 1973, State Road 29 was not initially planned to have an interchange with the freeway due to environmental concerns.  This decision was reversed in 1989 during construction of I-75 and interchange ramps were included after steps were taken to protect the endangered Florida panther.

Related routes

LaBelle truck route

State Road 29 Truck is a truck detour along South Bridge Street. It begins at the northwest corner of LaBelle Airport south of the southeast corner of SR 29 and CR 80A. SR 29 Truck also intersects CR 80A, and runs along the east side of SR 29 until it reaches SR 80 near the Old Hendry County Courthouse.

Collier County

County Road 29A is a route bypassing Immokalee to the northeast. It runs mostly southeast to northwest, and is named New Market Road.

County Road 29A begins as New Market Road East, as a straight south to north road until it approaches a local fire station on the northeast corner of an access road to Immokalee Airport, and curves to the northwest. The road serves as the headquarters for the Immokalee State Farmer's Market. At Charlotte Street New Market Road East becomes New Market Road West. The straight northwestern to southeastern pattern continues until it curves to the west and approaches the terminus at SR 29 and Westclox Road north of the city, but not before a northbound turning ramp forks off to the right.

Hendry County

County Road 29A is a short, former segment of State Road 29 in LaBelle. It runs north along North Main Street from the SR 29-80 multiplex at the Hendry County Courthouse to Park Avenue, where it turns east terminating a block later at Bridge Street(SR 29) at the foot of the drawbridge over Caloosahatchee River.

Major intersections

References

External links

Florida Route Log (SR 29)

029
029
029
029